Rangapara North Junction railway station is a main railway station in Sonitpur district, Assam. Its code is RPAN. It serves Rangapara city. The station consists of 5 platforms. This station has been upgraded to a standard B Class Station.

Major trains 
 New Delhi–Dibrugarh Rajdhani Express (Via Rangapara North)
 Arunachal AC Superfast Express
 New Tinsukia - Tambaram Weekly Express
 Dibrugarh - Howrah Kamrup Express Via Rangapara North
 Kamakhya–Murkongselek Lachit Express
 Naharlagun−Guwahati Shatabdi Express
 Rangiya–Rangapara North Passenger
 Dekargaon–Bhalukpong Passenger
 Guwahati–Dekargaon Intercity Express
 Naharlagun–Shokhuvi Donyi Polo Express
 Rangapara North–Dekargaon Passenger

References

Railway stations in Sonitpur district
Rangiya railway division